Kitana may refer to:

 Kitana, a Mortal Kombat character
 Cherie Roberts or Kitana Jade, an adult model

See also
 Katana (disambiguation)